Brunswick is a town in Columbus County, North Carolina, United States. The population was 1,119 at the 2010 census.

Geography
Brunswick is located at  (34.292821, -78.706930).

Demographics

2020 census

As of the 2020 United States census, there were 973 people, 172 households, and 113 families residing in the town.

2000 census
At the 2000 census there were 360 people, 144 households, and 101 families in the town. The population density was 866.9 people per square mile (330.9/km). There were 165 housing units at an average density of 397.3 per square mile (151.7/km).  The racial makeup of the town was 41.94% White, 55.00% African American, 2.78% Native American, and 0.28% from two or more races. Hispanic or Latino of any race were 0.83%.

Of the 144 households 27.1% had children under the age of 18 living with them, 40.3% were married couples living together, 26.4% had a female householder with no husband present, and 29.2% were non-families. 25.7% of households were one person and 9.7% were one person aged 65 or older. The average household size was 2.50 and the average family size was 3.02.

The age distribution was 23.6% under the age of 18, 10.8% from 18 to 24, 21.9% from 25 to 44, 23.9% from 45 to 64, and 19.7% 65 or older. The median age was 40 years. For every 100 females, there were 73.1 males. For every 100 females age 18 and over, there were 73.0 males.

The median household income was $15,795 and the median family income  was $16,786. Males had a median income of $22,361 versus $20,625 for females. The per capita income for the town was $10,288. About 37.0% of families and 42.3% of the population were below the poverty line, including 72.4% of those under age 18 and 31.1% of those age 65 or over.

References

Towns in North Carolina
Towns in Columbus County, North Carolina